Euclid is an unincorporated community in Polk County, Minnesota, United States. Euclid has a post office with ZIP code 56722.

History
A post office called Euclid has been in operation since 1879. The community was named after Euclid Avenue, a main boulevard of Cleveland, Ohio.

Population 
Euclid has a population of 132, of whom 54.5% are male and 45.5% female. The average age is estimated at 48.5. There are two main ethnicities, white and Hispanic, which are respectively 97% and 3% of the population. The average number of residents per household is estimated at 2.32, with an estimated 57 households in the area.

References

Former municipalities in Minnesota
Unincorporated communities in Polk County, Minnesota
Unincorporated communities in Minnesota